The Volta a Portugal, also known as Volta a Portugal em Bicicleta, is an annual multi-stage road bicycle racing competition held in Portugal. The competition takes place during a two-week span.

History 
The competition started in 1927, although its second edition only occurred in 1931. In 1936 and 1937 the tour did not take place. During World War II the race was cancelled between 1942 and 1945. In 1975 the competition was skipped due to the Carnation Revolution.

In the period 1940–1980 the competition was staged over three weeks. Since the 1980s it was reduced to the period of two weeks. As of 2005 the race consisted only of ten stages. In the last years the race consisted of ten stages and a prologue (a short time trial that starts the race). It is still the longest competition in cycling after the three grand Tours. It is one of the oldest stage races in the world. Although not as important as the three Grand Tours, it has long been a significant competition. In the last few years, however, it has declined in importance, especially because it now takes place immediately after the Tour de France, and before the Vuelta a España, a schedule that precludes the participation of major teams and cyclists.

List of winners

Wins by cyclist 
In bold cyclist still active.

1 win
Adelino Teixeira
Alejandro Marque
Amaro Antunes
Américo Silva
Antoine Houbrechts
Augusto de Carvalho
Belmiro Silva
Carlos Carvalho
Cássio Freitas
Cayn Theakston
César Luís
Claus Moller
David Bernabéu
David Plaza
Fabian Jeker
Fernando Carvalho
Fernando Mendes dos Reis Dias

Fernando Moreira
Firmino Bernardino
Francisco Inácio
Francisco Miranda
Francisco Valada
Jesús Manzaneque
João Rodrigues
João Roque
Joaquim Andrade
Joaquim Fernandes
Joaquim Leão
Joaquim Sousa Santos
Jorge Silva
José Pacheco
Manuel Cunha
Manuel Zeferino
Marco Serpellini
Mário Silva

Massimiliano Lelli
Moreira de Sá
Nuno Ribeiro
Peixoto Alves
Ricardo Mestre
Rui Vinhas
Sousa Cardoso
Venceslau Fernandes
Vítor Gamito
Vladimir Efimkin
Xavier Tondo
Zenon Jaskuła

Wins by team

Wins by country

Classifications
As of the 2016 edition, the jerseys worn by the leaders of the individual classifications are:
  Yellow Jersey – Worn by the leader of the general classification.
  Green Jersey – Worn by the leader of the points classification.
  Blue Jersey – Worn by the leader of the climbing classification. 
  White Jersey – Worn by the best rider under 23 years of age on the overall classification.

References

External links

Volta a Portugal
Cycle races in Portugal
UCI Europe Tour races
Recurring sporting events established in 1927
1927 establishments in Portugal
Summer events in Portugal
August sporting events